SRH may refer to:
Sunrisers Hyderabad, an Indian cricket team
SRH Presents: Supporting Radical Habits, a 2005 compilation album
Scottish Radio Holdings
Storm relative helicity in meteorology
Socialist Republic of Croatia
Streatham Hill railway station, London, National Rail station code SRH
Shockley-Read-Hall recombination in solid-state physics